Tim Campulka (born 28 April 1999) is a German footballer who plays as a midfielder for Chemnitzer FC.

References

External links
 Profile at FuPa.net

1999 births
Living people
German footballers
People from Erzgebirgskreis
Footballers from Saxony
Association football midfielders
Chemnitzer FC players
3. Liga players
Regionalliga players